José Maria Pereira (born 9 October 1932) is a Brazilian fencer. He competed in the team épée event at the 1968 Summer Olympics.

References

External links
 

1932 births
Living people
Brazilian male épée fencers
Olympic fencers of Brazil
Fencers at the 1968 Summer Olympics
Sportspeople from Rio Grande do Sul
Fencers at the 1963 Pan American Games
Pan American Games silver medalists for Brazil
Pan American Games medalists in fencing
20th-century Brazilian people